"All That I've Got" is a song by American rock band the Used, released as the second single from their second studio album, In Love and Death (2004), in December 2004. The song was dedicated to Bert McCracken's dog, David Bowie, who was hit by a truck during the making of the album. An acoustic version was later released on iTunes. It also appeared on the Saints Row 2 soundtrack.

Meaning
The song is about lead singer Bert McCracken's girlfriend dying of an overdose while pregnant. It is also believed to be partially inspired by the death of his pet dog in the month after this.

Track listings
CD single 1

CD single 2

Personnel 
The Used
 Bert McCracken – vocals
 Quinn Allman – guitar
 Jeph Howard – bass
 Branden Steineckert – drums

Charts

Acoustic version
An acoustic version of "All That I've Got" was released on iTunes on June 28, 2005, the same day as the acoustic version of "Lunacy Fringe".

References

The Used songs
2004 singles
2004 songs
Reprise Records singles
Song recordings produced by John Feldmann
Songs written by Bert McCracken
Songs written by Branden Steineckert
Songs written by Jeph Howard
Songs written by Quinn Allman
Warner Records singles